Kfar Qassem BS Club is a professional beach soccer team based in Kfar Qassem, Israel. Kfar Qassem has won 5 national championships, more than any beach soccer team in Israel. In 2018, the club reached Nazaré Cup's final, but lost 2-3 to Kristall and therefore finished as the runners-up.

Historical results

Squads

2019 Israeli Beach Soccer League squad

2022 Euro Winners Cup squad

Coach:  Mamon Amer

Honours

International competitions

Nazaré Cup
 Runners-up (1): 2018

National competitions

Israeli Beach Soccer League
 Winners (5): 2012, 2013, 2015, 2016, 2019
 Runners-up (2): 2017, 2018

References

Israeli beach soccer teams